The 2012 Spa-Francorchamps GP3 Series round was a GP3 Series motor race held on September 1 and 2, 2012 at Circuit de Spa-Francorchamps, Belgium. It was the seventh round of the 2012 GP3 Series. The race supported the 2012 Belgian Grand Prix.

Classification

Qualifying

Race 1

Race 2

Standings after the round 

 Drivers' Championship standings

 Teams' Championship standings

 Note: Only the top five positions are included for both sets of standings.

See also 
 2012 Belgian Grand Prix
 2012 Spa-Francorchamps GP2 Series round

References 

Spa-Francorchamps
GP3